Niangoloko is a town and seat of the Niangoloko Department in southwestern Burkina Faso. It is located near the city of Banfora and the border with Côte d'Ivoire. The town has a population of 33,292.

Transport 

The town is served by a station on the Abidjan-Ouagadougou railway. It is also connected to Banfora via regular bush taxi service.

See also 

 Railway stations in Burkina Faso

References 

Populated places in the Cascades Region